Ian Bradley Walker (born 18 November 1954) is an Australian politician. He was a Liberal National member of the Queensland Legislative Assembly from 2012 to 2017, representing the electorate of Mansfield. He was Minister for Science, Information Technology, Innovation and the Arts from 2013 to 2015 under Campbell Newman.

Following the LNP's electoral victory in 2012, Walker was appointed Assistant Minister for Planning Reform on 3 April 2012. On 17 February 2013, then Premier Campbell Newman appointed Walker as the new Minister for Science, Information Technology, Innovation and the Arts after the resignation of Ros Bates.

Following the LNP's defeat at the 2015 Queensland election, Walker was succeeded as Minister by Leeanne Enoch (Science and Innovation) and Premier Annastacia Palaszczuk (Arts).

Despite the statewide defeat of the LNP, Walker narrowly retained Mansfield, a noted bellwether seat, becoming its second opposition member. The first, fellow Liberal Frank Carroll, served in opposition for a few months in 1995 and 1996 before a by-election elevated the Coalition to minority government.

The Opposition Leader Lawrence Springborg appointed Walker to the Shadow Cabinet, giving him the roles of Shadow Attorney-General and Shadow Minister for Justice, Shadow Minister for Industrial Relations and Shadow Minister for the Arts.

Walker's seat of Mansfield was altered by an electoral redistribution for the 2017 election, becoming a notionally Labor seat with a 0.8% Labor margin, as opposed to Walker's 0.5% margin from the 2015 election. He recontested his seat on the new boundaries, but was defeated by Labor candidate Corrine McMillan.

Walker was educated at the Anglican Church Grammar School.

References

External links
Official webpage

1954 births
Living people
Members of the Queensland Legislative Assembly
Liberal National Party of Queensland politicians
People educated at Anglican Church Grammar School
Australian solicitors
21st-century Australian politicians